Colin Edward Bendelle (13 July 1944 – 27 August 2007) was  a former Australian rules footballer who played with Footscray in the Victorian Football League (VFL).

Notes

External links 

1944 births
2007 deaths
Australian rules footballers from Victoria (Australia)
Western Bulldogs players